Caffè Giubbe Rosse is a historical literary café in Piazza della Repubblica, Florence.
When opened in 1896, the cafè was actually called "Fratelli Reininghaus". It was named "Giubbe Rosse" (Red jackets or coats) in 1910, after the red jackets which waiters used to wear every day.

The restaurant-café has a long-standing reputation as the resort of literati and intellectuals. Alberto Viviani defined the Giubbe Rosse as "" ("a forge of dreams and passions"). The Giubbe Rosse was the place where the Futurist movement blossomed, struggled and expanded; it played a very important role in the history of Italian culture as a workshop of ideas, projects, and passions. "We want to celebrate love of danger, of constant energy, and courage. We want to encourage going in aggressive new directions, feverish sleeplessness, running, deathly leaps, slaps and blows".

Poets such as Ardengo Soffici, Giovanni Papini, Eugenio Montale, Filippo Tommaso Marinetti, Giuseppe Prezzolini and many others met and wrote in this literary café an important venue of Italian literature in the beginning of the 20th century.

Important magazines such as Solaria and Lacerba originated here from the writers who frequented the café.

In 2019, a second important movement, the Empathism, (in Italian: Scuola Empatica / Empatismo) was launched in this prestigious cultural hub by Menotti Lerro, Antonello Pelliccia and others.

This cozy literary café, founded by two Germans, the Reininghaus brothers, in 1896, at the moment (since 2021) is permanently closed for financial problems.

Some of the most recent Exhibitions and Presentations 

 In 2012 literary meeting with Giorgina poet Busca Gernetti entitled "Classicità e Modernità nella poesia di Giorgina Busca Gernetti". Introduction by Onorevole Marco Cellai. critical relationships of prof. Enrico Nistri, Prof. Anna Maria Giglio, artist Lilly Brogi and the poet Giancarlo Bianchi.
 In 2015 literary meeting the great classical and contemporary poetry interpreted by actor Franco Costantini organized by La Pergola Arte. Franco Costantini before he played Dante Alighieri musical accompaniment on guitar by Raimondo Raimondi spacing out his performance with a dissertation on of endecasillabo value and finally recited the lyrics of Lilly Brogi, Menotti Galeotti, Anna Balsamo, Alfredo Vernacotola, Giancarlo Bianchi, Ornella Fiorentini.
 In 2016 Moran presented the novel by Matilde Calamai . Speakers Giulio Greco and Lilly Brogi  was present the doctor Aldo Giovanelli founder of Pengo Life Project and Italian Ambassador of the David Sheldrick Wildlife Trust who spoke about the situation of African wildlife.

Giubbe Rosse's series
Vol. 1 – Leopoldo Paciscopi – Gli anni discontinui – Seduto al caffè con Rosai e Conti
Vol. 2 – Leopoldo Paciscopi – Nel chiaror della luna
Vol. 3 – AA.VV. – La letteratura italiana alla fine del Millennio
Vol. 4 – AA.VV. – I cent' anni di Montale
Vol. 5 – Marino Andorlini – L'ansia delle vette
Vol. 6 – Silvano Zoi – Il manuale dello scrittore
Vol. 7 – Geno Pampaloni – Sul ponte tra novecento e duemila
Vol. 8 – AA.VV. – Il Giubileo letterario di Vittorio Vettori
Vol. 9 – Manlio Sgalambro – Opus Postumissimum
Vol. 10 – L. Pignotti e E. Miccini – Poesie in azione
Vol. 11 – Giovanni Lista – Lo sperma nero
Vol. 12 – Mario Luzi – L'avventura della dualità
Vol. 13 – Menotti Lerro – Ceppi incerti
Vol. 14 – Lorella Rotondi – La misura del canto
Vol. 15 – Paolo Guzzi – Teatro e no
Vol. 16 – Massimo Mori – Performer – a cura di Stefano Lanuzza
Vol. 17 – Vladimir Swarovski – Trattato di Pigheologia

Gallery

Notes

External links 
 

TG3 RAI Launch of the "New Manifesto of Arts", 2019

Italian literature
Culture in Florence
Coffeehouses and cafés in Italy
Buildings and structures in Florence
Tourist attractions in Florence